Santa Rosa Airport  is an airport in La Pampa Province, Argentina serving the cities of Santa Rosa and Toay. The airport is on the northeast corner of Santa Rosa.

History
The airport was built in 1940. 1 September 1940 was the first regular flight to Santa Rosa, a military Junkers en route from Buenos Aires to Esquel Airport vía Santa Rosa, Neuquén, and San Carlos de Bariloche Airport.

The terminal was built in 1971. An Instrument Landing System and radio beacon were installed in 1996, and in 1999, Aeropuertos Argentina 2000 took over management of the airport.

Airlines and destinations 
Santa Rosa was previously a destination of LADE, LAER, and Southern Winds. In 2007, 12915 passengers used the airport.

See also

Transport in Argentina
List of airports in Argentina

References

External links 
FallingRain - Santa Rosa
OurAirports - Santa Rosa Airport

Airports in Argentina